Nationality words link to articles with information on the nation's poetry or literature (for instance, Irish or France).

Events
 6 November – Czech romantic poet Karel Hynek Mácha, having overexerted himself while helping put out a fire, dies just short of his 26th birthday of pneumonia in Litoměřice; his burial (in a pauper's grave) is held on the day of his intended wedding to Eleonora Šomková about a month after the birth of their child.
 The literary, social and political quarterly Sovremennik (Современник, literally The Contemporary), edited by Russian poet Alexander Pushkin, begins publication in Saint Petersburg. It publishes Fyodor Tyutchev's poetry and the fourth issue contains Pushkin's historical novel The Captain's Daughter.

Works published in English

United Kingdom
 Bernard Barton and Lucy Barton, The Reliquary
 Walter Savage Landor, A Satire on Satirists, and Admonition to Detractors
 Francis Sylvester Mahony, The Reliques of Father Prout, Irish poet
 Caroline Norton, A Voice from the Factories
 Catherine Eliza Richardson Grandmamma's Sampler; with Some Other Rhymes for Children
 William Wordsworth, The Poetical Works of William Wordsworth, published in six volumes from this year to 1837 in poetry (a revised text from Poetical Works 1827; new edition with corrections published in 1839; see also Miscellaneous Poems 1820, Poetical Works 1840, Poems 1845, Poetical Works (Centenary Edition) 1870)
 Lyra Apostolica, religious poetry anthology, including verse by John Henry Newman
 Letitia Elizabeth Landon, writing under the pen name "L.E.L." Fisher's Drawing Room Scrap Book, 1837

United States
 Elizabeth Margaret Chandler, Poetical Works, anti-slavery and descriptive poems, including "The Captured Slave" and "The Sunset Hour"; published posthumously
 Oliver Wendell Holmes, Sr., Poems, early verse in the author's first poetry book, much of it humorous, such as "Ballad of the Oysterman" and "My Aunt", but other pieces with pathos, such as "The Last Leaf" and "Old Ironsides"
 John Greenleaf Whittier, "Mogg Megone", a critically well-received poem about Native Americans in Maine and the relationship of Indians and Catholic missionaries

Works published in other languages
Girolamo de Rada, Këngët e Milosaos, Arbëresh
Andreas Munch, Ephemerer, Norwegian
France Prešeren, The Baptism on the Savica, Slovene

Births
Death years link to the corresponding "[year] in poetry" article:
 3 January – Annie Hawks (died 1918), American poet and hymnist
 15 January – Frances Laughton Mace (died 1899), American
 15 February – Matsudaira Katamori 松平容保 (died 1893), Japanese samurai and poet in the last days of the Edo period and the early to mid Meiji period (surname: Matsudaira)
 17 February – Gustavo Adolfo Bécquer (died 1870), Spanish Andalusian poet and short-story writer
 22 June – Annie Louisa Walker (died 1907), English-born Canadian
 11 August – Sarah Morgan Bryan Piatt (died 1919), American
 25 August – Bret Harte (died 1902), American poet and writer
 4 September – Marion Juliet Mitchell (unknown year of death), American
 11 November – Thomas Bailey Aldrich (died 1907), American
 18 November – W. S. Gilbert (died 1911), English comic poet and librettist
 28 November – Amelia Denis de Icaza (died 1911), Panamanian
 4 December (probable date) – Duncan MacGregor Crerar (died 1916), Scottish
 14 December – Frances Ridley Havergal (died 1879), English religious poet and hymnwriter

Deaths
Birth years link to the corresponding "[year] in poetry" article:
 5 March – William Taylor (born 1765), English man of letters
 14 March – John Mayne (born 1759), Scottish-born poet, journalist and printer
 4 April – John Grieve (born 1781), Scottish
 20 August – Agnes Bulmer (born 1775), English poet
 17 October – George Colman the Younger (born 1762), English playwright and poet
 5 November – Karel Hynek Mácha (born 1810), Czech

See also

 List of years in poetry
 List of years in literature
 19th century in literature
 19th century in poetry
 Golden Age of Russian Poetry (1800–1850)
 Young Germany (Junges Deutschland) a loose group of German writers from about 1830 to 1850
 List of poets
 Poetry
 List of poetry awards

Notes

19th-century poetry
Poetry